Lac Gentau is a lake in Pyrénées-Atlantiques, Pyrénées, France. At an elevation of 1947 m, its surface area is 0.093 km².

Lakes of Pyrénées-Atlantiques